Barbara Adams may refer to:

 Barbara Adams (attorney) (born 1951), American attorney
 Barbara Adams (Egyptologist) (1945–2002), British Egyptologist
 Barbara Adams (politician), member of the Progressive Conservative Association of Nova Scotia, Canada

See also
 Barbara Adam (born 1945), British sociologist